Michael Glenn Mullen (born October 4, 1946) is a retired United States Navy admiral, who served as the 17th chairman of the Joint Chiefs of Staff from October 1, 2007, to September 30, 2011.

Mullen previously served as the Navy's 28th chief of Naval Operations from July 22, 2005, to September 29, 2007. He was only the third officer in the Navy's history to be appointed to four different four-star assignments; the other appointments being the Commander, U.S. Naval Forces Europe and Commander, Allied Joint Force Command Naples from October 2004 to May 2005, and as the 32nd vice chief of Naval Operations from August 2003 to August 2004. As Chairman, Mullen was the highest-ranking officer in the United States Armed Forces and diversified the top ranks of the Pentagon. He retired from the Navy after over 42 years of service. Since 2012, Mullen has been a visiting professor at Princeton University's School of Public and International Affairs.

Early life and education
Mullen was born on October 4, 1946, in Los Angeles, the eldest of five children of Mary Jane (Glenn), who worked as an assistant to comedian Jimmy Durante, and Hollywood press agent John Edward "Jack" Mullen. He attended St. Charles Borromeo Church School in North Hollywood, and graduated from Notre Dame High School, Sherman Oaks in 1964. Mullen then attended the United States Naval Academy in Annapolis and was classmates with former Commandant of the Marine Corps Michael Hagee, former Chief of Naval Operations Jay L. Johnson, former Secretary of the Navy and Senator from Virginia Jim Webb, National Security Council staff member during the Iran–Contra affair Oliver North, former Director of National Intelligence Dennis C. Blair, and NASA administrator Charles Bolden. He graduated with a Bachelor of Science degree in 1968.

Along with his congeniality, [he] displayed fine leadership qualities. With his well rounded personality, his enthusiasm, and his desire to do his best, Navy-Air is indeed getting an outstanding officer. -- 1968 Lucky Bag, USNA college yearbook

Naval career

Early career

Mullen's last command at sea was as Commander, U.S. Second Fleet/Commander, NATO Striking Fleet Atlantic (COMSTRIKFLTLANT).

In 1985, Mullen graduated from the Naval Postgraduate School in Monterey, California, with a Master of Science degree in Operations Research, and in 1991, he attended the six-week Harvard Business School Advanced Management Program.

Mullen served as Company Officer and Executive Assistant to the Commandant of Midshipmen at the U.S. Naval Academy. He also served in the Bureau of Naval Personnel as Director, Chief of Planning and Provisions, Surface Officer Distribution and in the Office of the Secretary of Defense on the staff of the Director, Operational Test and Evaluation. On the Chief of Naval Operations' staff, Mullen served as Deputy Director and Director of Surface Warfare and as Deputy Chief of Naval Operations for Resources, Requirements, and Assessments (N8). He was the 32nd Vice Chief of Naval Operations from August 2003 to October 2004.

Mullen was recognized by his peers in 1987 with the Vice Admiral James Bond Stockdale Award for Inspirational Leadership skill.

As Commander, Allied Joint Force Command Naples, Mullen had operational responsibility for NATO missions in the Balkans, Iraq, and the Mediterranean. As Commander, U.S. Naval Forces Europe, he was responsible for providing overall command, operational control, and coordination of U.S. naval forces in the European Command area of responsibility. He assumed these duties on October 8, 2004, and was relieved of them upon his becoming Chief of Naval Operations.

On October 29, 2006, the Honolulu Advertiser published an op-ed by Mullen that defined the concept of the 1,000-ship navy. However Admiral Gary Roughead, Mullen's successor as Chief of Naval Operations, rejected Mullen's concept in favor of a more inclusive vision that includes non-governmental organizations and cooperation with non-allied countries.

Chairman of the Joint Chiefs of Staff 
On June 8, 2007, Secretary of Defense Robert M. Gates announced that he would advise President George W. Bush to nominate Mullen to succeed General Peter Pace as Chairman of the Joint Chiefs of Staff; Bush announced the nomination formally on June 28, 2007.

On August 3, 2007, the United States Senate confirmed Mullen as the Chairman of the Joint Chiefs of Staff. Mullen was sworn in on October 1, 2007. Upon taking office, Mullen became the first naval officer to hold the Chairman's position since Admiral William J. Crowe, who served as Chairman prior to the enactment of the Goldwater-Nichols Act in 1986, and who was the immediate predecessor to Army general and later United States Secretary of State Colin Powell.

During his tenure, he was responsible for the appointment of multiple African-American officers to the highest ranks of the military, including the appointment of General Lloyd Austin, now the first black secretary of defense, as Director of the Joint Staff.

On March 18, 2009, Gates recommended to President Barack Obama that Mullen be re-nominated for a second term as chairman of the Joint Chiefs. He was unanimously confirmed by the Senate on September 25, 2009 and began his second term on October 1, 2009.

On February 2, 2010, Mullen and Gates said that they fully supported President Obama's decision to end the "Don't ask, don't tell" policy, which prevented openly gay people from serving in the military. "It is my personal belief that allowing gays and lesbians to serve openly would be the right thing to do," Mullen said at a Senate Armed Services Committee hearing. "No matter how I look at the issue...I cannot escape being troubled by the fact that we have in place a policy which forces young men and women to lie about who they are in order to defend their fellow citizens. For me, it comes down to integrity—theirs as individuals and ours as an institution."

2007 Senate testimony regarding the Iraq War
During Mullen's Senate confirmation hearings for his first term nomination as Chairman of the Joint Chiefs of Staff, Mullen identified political progress in Iraq as a critical component of Iraq policy. He noted that, "there does not appear to be much political progress" in Iraq. He also said, "If [the Iraqis] aren't making progress in [the political] realm, the prospects for movement in a positive direction are not very good. Failure to achieve tangible progress toward [political] reconciliation requires a strategic reassessment." Mullen further told the Senate that the United States needs to "bring as much pressure on [Iraq's political leaders] as [the U.S.] possibly can."

Regarding the length and scope of the U.S. involvement in Iraq, Mullen told the Senate that while he does not envision permanent U.S. bases in Iraq, "vital interests in the region and in Iraq require a pragmatic, long-term commitment that will be measured in years, not months."

Debt
In 2010, Mullen said, "The most significant threat to our national security is our debt."

Don't Ask, Don't Tell Repeal Act of 2010
President Obama, United States Secretary of Defense Leon Panetta and Admiral Mullen provided the certification required by the Act to Congress on July 22, 2011. Implementation of repeal was completed 60 days later, so that DADT was no longer policy as of September 20, 2011.

Views on use of military force
In a speech at Kansas State University, Mullen outlined his views about the best application of military force in present times. He characterized most wars, such as World War II, as wars of attrition, where the reduction or elimination of enemy forces signaled victory. He characterized the Cold War as an issue of containment. In characterizing the current wars in Iraq and Afghanistan, he described them as "a fight against a syndicate of Islamic extremists led by al-Qaeda and supported by a host of both state and non-state actors", citing the border between Afghanistan and Pakistan as their "epicenter".

Mullen outlined three principles about the "proper use of modern military forces":

 Military power should not be the last resort of the state: Mullen pointed to the readiness and capacity of military forces to respond to crises as reason to deploy them sooner, rather than later, in response. "We can, merely by our presence, help alter certain behavior."
 Force should be applied in a precise and principled way: Mullen cites the sacrifice involved in deployment as requiring extreme care. Secondly, Mullen argues that "the battlefield isn't necessarily a field anymore. It's in the minds of the people." He cites General Stanley McChrystal's restriction of night raids I as an example of this principle in action.
 Policy and strategy should constantly engage with one another: Given that current engagements are open-ended, Mullen posits that military strategy must be more constantly engaged with policy. "...war has never been a set-piece affair. The enemy adapts to your strategy and you adapt to his." He cites the review process which led to the current Afghanistan escalation as a model of engagement between military leaders and policy makers.

During the aftermath of the murder of George Floyd, President Trump threatened to order federal troops to quell protests; in opposition, Mullen authored an article published in The Atlantic. Mullen stated, “I am deeply worried that as they execute their orders, the members of our military will be co-opted for political purposes.”

Retirement
President Obama nominated General Martin Dempsey as the next Chairman of the Joint Chiefs of Staff on Memorial Day 2011. Dempsey had only been sworn in as army chief of staff the previous month. On September 30, 2011, Mullen officially retired from the military when his term as chairman ended.

In December 2012, one year into his retirement, Mullen was in the news again, for having been the target of computer hacking, a situation that led to subsequent FBI investigations. In 2013, Mullen joined the board of General Motors.

On July 11, 2013, Mullen joined the Board of Directors of Sprint Nextel Corp directly after a buyout from SoftBank, one of Japan's largest cellular companies. In 2016, Mullen joined the Advisory Board of Afiniti, an American unicorn big data and artificial intelligence business.

Mullen was vetted by Michael Bloomberg to be his running mate in the 2016 presidential election, but Bloomberg decided against running.

In an interview with ABC News on December 31, 2017, Mullen stated his belief that the United States was close to a nuclear war with North Korea.

Dates of rank

Military awards

United States military decorations

Non-U.S. decorations

Badges

Other awards
In 1987, Mullen was awarded the Vice Admiral James Bond Stockdale Award for Inspirational Leadership.
In 2009 the U.S. veterans group Soldier On awarded Admiral Mullen the first Soldier On Award, created for them by sculptor Andrew DeVries. The Soldier On Award recognizes individuals whose leadership and actions have advanced the goal of ending veteran homelessness.

In 2010, Mullen was appointed an Honorary Officer of the Order of Australia.

An auditorium was dedicated in his name March 1, 2012, before a graduation ceremony at the Surface Warfare Officers School in Newport, Rhode Island.

Personal life

Mullen is married to Deborah and together they have two sons, CDR John “JMuls” Mullen and Michael Edward Mullen.  CDR Mullen is currently the Commanding Officer of NTAG OHIO River Valley.

References

External links

Chairman's Corner Blog 
Official Joint Chiefs of Staff Web site
Biography

Complete transcript, audio, video of Admiral Mullen's Retirement Farewell Speech AmericanRhetoric.com

|-

|-

|-

|-
|-

1946 births
Living people
United States Navy personnel of the Vietnam War
Atlantic Council
Chairmen of the Joint Chiefs of Staff
Chiefs of Naval Operations
Honorary Members of the Order of Australia
Honorary Officers of the Order of Australia
Knights Commander of the Order of Merit of the Federal Republic of Germany
Naval Postgraduate School alumni
Nominated members of Seanad Éireann
Notre Dame High School (Sherman Oaks, California) alumni
People from Los Angeles
Recipients of the Defense Distinguished Service Medal
Recipients of the Defense Superior Service Medal
Recipients of the Legion of Merit
Recipients of the Navy Distinguished Service Medal
Recipients of the Vice Admiral James Bond Stockdale Award for Inspirational Leadership
United States Naval Academy alumni
United States Navy admirals
Vice Chiefs of Naval Operations
Recipients of the Humanitarian Service Medal
Military personnel from California